Baksa is a town in northwestern Syria, administratively part of the Latakia Governorate, located north of Latakia. Nearby localities include al-Shamiyah, Kirsana and al-Qanjarah to the north, Burj al-Qasab to the west, Sitmarkho to the east and Sqoubin to the south. According to the Syria Central Bureau of Statistics, Baksa had a population of 3,001 in the 2004 census. Its inhabitants are predominantly Alawites.

References

Populated places in Latakia District
Alawite communities in Syria